This is a  list of films and TV series produced in the country of Andorra.

1
 12 punts (2004, TV series)

A
 Amor idiota (2004)

D
 Don't Take The Name Of God In Vain (1999)

E
 Eurocasting (2004, TV miniseries)

M
 El Mundo de Pau Casals (1973)

P
 Le Paria (1969)
 La Perversa caricia de Satán (1976)

External links
 Andorran film at the Internet Movie Database

Andorra
Films